Neptunomonas qingdaonensis is a species of bacteria. It is Gram-negative, motile, aerobic, oxidase- and catalase-positive and rod-shaped. The type strain is P10-2-4(T) ( = CGMCC 1.10971(T)  = KCTC 23686(T)).

References

Further reading
Whitman, William B., et al., eds. Bergey's manual® of systematic bacteriology. Vol. 5. Springer, 2012.
Dworkin, Martin, and Stanley Falkow, eds. The Prokaryotes: Vol. 6: Proteobacteria: Gamma Subclass. Vol. 6. Springer, 2006.

Acton, Q. Ashton. Issues in Biological and Life Sciences Research: 2012 Edition. ScholarlyEditions, 2013.

External links
LPSN
Type strain of Neptunomonas qingdaonensis at BacDive -  the Bacterial Diversity Metadatabase

Oceanospirillales
Bacteria described in 2013